Canavalia rosea is a species of flowering plant of the genus Canavalia in the pea family of Fabaceae, it has a pantropical and subtropical distribution in upper beaches, cliffs, and dunes. Common names include beach bean, bay bean, sea bean, seaside jack-bean, coastal jack-bean, and MacKenzie bean.

Description

Vine 
Coastal jack-bean is a trailing, herbaceous vine that forms mats of foliage. Each compound leaf is made up of three leaflets  in diameter, which will fold themselves when exposed to hot sunlight. It is highly salt-tolerant and prefers sandy soils.

Flowers and pods 

Each pod has between 2–10 brown seeds. The seeds are buoyant so they can be distributed by ocean currents. The plant seems to contain L-Betonicine.

Uses 
Young seeds and pods are edible especially after boiling. The flowers can be made into a spice.

References

External links 

Canavalia rosea at JSTOR Plant Science

rosea
Pantropical flora
Halophytes
Plants described in 1825
Taxa named by Augustin Pyramus de Candolle
Flora of the Coral Sea Islands Territory